King Fahd Mosque also known as King Fahd Bin Abdul Aziz Alsaud Mosque in Alipašino polje, Sarajevo, Bosnia and Herzegovina.

The largest mosque in Sarajevo, Bosnia and Herzegovina is the King Fahd Mosque. The religious building was established and funded by Saudi Arabia. The monument is known to attract Muslims from across the city and state to its doorsteps . A stunning structure, it is a major landmark in the city.

The King Fahd Mosque is the biggest in the Balkans.

Gallery

See also
 List of things named after Saudi Kings

References

External links
https://cityseeker.com/sarajevo/876154-king-fahd-mosque

Mosques in Sarajevo
Bosnia and Herzegovina–Saudi Arabia relations